Captain-major Jacques Felix was an explorer and pioneer of Brazil.  In 1640 he founded the city of Taubaté in São Paulo.

Year of death unknown
Explorers of South America
Year of birth unknown